KBFB (97.9 FM) is a commercial radio station with an urban contemporary radio format, known as "97.9 The Beat." It is licensed to Dallas, Texas and serves the Dallas-Fort Worth Metroplex.  KBFB is owned by Urban One.  The studios and offices, along with sister station KZMJ, are in the Galleria Area in North Dallas.

KBFB has an effective radiated power (ERP) of 100,000 watts. The transmitter is off Plateau Street in Cedar Hill, amid the towers for other Dallas-area FM and TV stations.  KBFB broadcasts using HD Radio technology.  The HD2 digital subchannel simulcasts the Urban AC format of co-owned KZMJ.

History

The Belo/Cox years
The station traces its history back to a October 5, 1946 sign-on, owned by the Belo Corporation, and was the first FM radio station to go on the air in Texas. It was called KERA-FM but with no relation to the current KERA (FM) (90.1 FM), or KERA-TV.

Even before KERA-FM's first day on the air, there was an experimental FM station "W5X1C" that began tests on October 15, 1945, and another trial dating back to 1939. By 1947, KERA-FM had moved from its original home at 94.3 FM to 97.9 FM under the WFAA-FM callsign, initially simulcasting its AM sister station WFAA (570 AM). With FM broadcasting in its infancy, Belo decided that the FM simulcast was not worthwhile and took WFAA-FM off the air on September 1, 1950.

The frequency remained dormant until 1958, when Belo decided to revive WFAA-FM, receiving a construction permit and putting WFAA-FM back on the air on January 6, 1961.  After simulcasting WFAA(AM) for a few years, a Beautiful Music format was established in 1965. The station played quarter-hour sweeps of mostly instrumental cover versions of popular songs, designed for relaxing or unobtrusive office listening.

On September 16, 1973, WFAA-FM flipped to album-oriented rock (AOR) as KZEW-FM, known to listeners as "The Zoo".  It featured disc jockeys such as John LaBella and John Rody ("LaBella and Rody"), George Gimarc, Charley Jones, Dave Lee Austin, John B. Wells, Nancy Johnson, John Dew, John Dillon, Doc Morgan and Tempie Lindsey.  The station's concept and programming were initially under the direction of Ira Lipson. The FM station shared studios with WFAA on the second floor of the facility.  The FM station was so popular that in several years, WFAA switched to a classic rock format as KRQX.

In 1987, KZEW and KRQX were sold by Belo (which retained ownership of the Dallas Morning News and WFAA-TV) to Atlanta-based Cox Radio. On December 11, 1989, KZEW dropped the rock format and began stunting with Christmas music. On January 1, 1990, KZEW switched formats to soft adult contemporary, changing its call sign to KKWM and rebranded as "Warm 97.9". A year later, the station changed its call sign again, this time to KLRX, and updated their branding to "Lite 97.9".

The Infinity/CBS years

In 1993, the station was sold to Infinity/CBS Radio, and on October 15, at 7 p.m., KLRX flipped to a classic hits/classic rock format under the KRRW call letters, and branded as "Arrow 97.9".

On April 3, 1997, the station switched back to adult contemporary as B-97.9 and changed to the current KBFB call letters. Programming during the AC format included the syndicated call in and request show, "Delilah."  After several years, Delilah's show shifted to then-sister station KVIL.

Urban Contemporary
KBFB flipped to Urban Contemporary as "97.9 The Beat" on September 26, 2000, after the station was sold to Radio One, a forerunner to today's Urban One. Since launch, the station has been in direct competition against longtime heritage urban station KKDA-FM.  KBFB and KKDA-FM also had a competitor with former Rhythmic Contemporary rival KZZA until the station flipped to Spanish Oldies in 2008.

In the beginning, the morning show on the station was hosted by Russ Parr (who started his radio career at KJMZ in the Metroplex).  In 2003, it was home to the Steve Harvey Morning Show through a syndicated simulcast from its sister station in Los Angeles, KKBT (also nicknamed "The Beat"). Eventually, Radio One switched KBFB's early slot to the Rickey Smiley Morning Show in 2005. Smiley was dropped in the fall of 2017, and was replaced with The Morning Hustle.

HD programming
Since the mid 2000s, KBFB has broadcast on HD Radio, though it never had a secondary HD multicast until March 2014. Since that time, KBFB-HD2 has simulcast Gainesville-based sister station KZMJ.

In February 2018, the station began broadcasting Vietnamese-language programming on HD3.  This was later switched to a Regional Mexican format.

References

External links
Official website

 DFWRadioArchives
 DFW Radio/TV History

Urban contemporary radio stations in the United States
Urban One stations
BFB
Radio stations established in 1947
1947 establishments in Texas